The Wrexham and District League was a football league in Wales. It was made up of teams from Wrexham County Borough,  Flintshire and Denbighshire

History
The Wrexham and District League ran during the early years of the twentieth century from 1903-1912. The league previous ran as the Welsh Senior League and the Denbighshire League.

At that time the senior clubs in the Wrexham area played in English leagues such as The Combination and the Birmingham & District League. Their reserve sides, along with local amateur teams, contested the Wrexham and District League. The Wrexham and District League folded in 1912 and its clubs joined the North Wales Alliance League.

In the inter-war years, the new Welsh National League with its various sections was organised. Clubs from the Wrexham area, and the rest of North Wales, joined the Welsh National League Northern Section which ran from 1921-1930. 

Teams from the Wrexham Area competed in the Wrexham and District League (1925-1939).

After World War II they re-organised as the Welsh National League (Wrexham Area).

Divisional Champions

1903–1912

1925–1939

References

Welsh National League (Wrexham Area)
Football leagues in Wales
Sport in Wrexham
Defunct football competitions in Wales